Heliophanus abditus is a jumping spider species in the genus Heliophanus.  It was first described by Wanda Wesołowska in 1986 and is found in Syria, United Arab Emirates and Yemen.

References

Spiders described in 1986
Fauna of Syria
Spiders of the Arabian Peninsula
Salticidae
Spiders of Western Asia
Taxa named by Wanda Wesołowska